The Polesworth School is a coeducational secondary school located in Dordon, near Polesworth, Warwickshire, England. The Headteacher is Maura Favell.

History
The Polesworth School was founded in 1881 as an elementary school taking students between the ages of three and fourteen. It became a Secondary Modern in 1944, a Warwickshire High School in 1957, a 12 – 18 Comprehensive in 1976 and an 11 – 18 school in 1994.

In February 2011, the School was given Academy status and is simply called The Polesworth School.

It is part of the Community Academies Trust.

Facilities
The school occupies a  site in the Polesworth area.  Its facilities include a Sports Centre whose use is shared with the community, a Drama Studio and a separate sixth form block with its own teaching, study and social areas.

An aerial view of the School can be seen here.

Houses and Year Group-Based Tutorial System
All students are in one of the following Houses: Arden, Kenilworth, Stratford or Warwick.

In September 2021, the mixed age tutorial system was taken out for a year group-based tutorial system due to COVID-19 restrictions. Each House has eight tutor groups per year. Each tutor group has a tutor and a co-tutor. The tutor groups include students from separate year groups (Years 7 – 13). The Tutorial Groups contain students from singular years.

The Polesworth School 6th Form (@ Tomlinson Hall)
The Polesworth School Sixth Form at Tomlinson Hall is the Sixth Form Centre. It houses around 200 students in year 12 and 13. 6th formers have their own study area complete with a suite of computers and laptops for use during private study.

References

External links
The Polesworth School Website
Ofsted Entry and Inspection Report
DfES Performance Tables

Academies in Warwickshire
Secondary schools in Warwickshire
Polesworth